Dalhatu United Football Club is a Nigerian football club based in Gusau, Zamfara State. They play in the second level of professional football in Nigeria, the Nigeria National League.

Current Team

External links

[Sports commission scraps directorate]

Football clubs in Nigeria
Zamfara State
Sports clubs in Nigeria